Flash Bang Grenada is an American hip hop duo based in Los Angeles, California. It consists of Busdriver and Nocando.

History
Flash Bang Grenada released the debut album, 10 Haters, on Hellfyre Club in 2011. It featured vocal contributions from Open Mike Eagle and Del the Funky Homosapien. It was chosen by Alarm as one of the 50 Unheralded Albums from 2011.

Discography
Albums
 10 Haters (2011)

References

External links
 

Alternative hip hop groups
American musical duos
Musical groups established in 2011
Rappers from Los Angeles
West Coast hip hop musicians
2011 establishments in California